Francesco "Ciccio" Cappuccio ( – 5 December 1892), also known as  ("The Young Man"), was a legendary guappo and the capintesta (head-in-chief) of the Camorra, a Mafia-type organisation in Naples in Italy, in the last half of the 19th century. He is credited with modernizing the Bella Società Riformata (Beautiful Reformed Society) as the Camorra was known at the time.

Camorra background

Ciccio Cappuccio was raised in a known criminal family in the infamous Imbrecciata street in the Vicaria neighbourhood in Naples, a zone full of violence, prostitution and camorristi. The family ruled the area since 1756 when Leopoldo Cappuccio, known as 'O Mastriano, imposed his authority. In 1781, a Royal decree ordered all brothels in Naples to be moved to the Imbrecciata, which became the only zone where prostitution was tolerated.

The only authority that ruled the area was the Camorra, which maintained order by force as a kind of unappointed justice of the peace while demanding kickbacks. In 1853, Ciccio Cappuccio took over the reins of his father Antonio Totonno Cappuccio, who ran a tavern in the area.

In 1855, the municipality surrounded the Imbrecciata prostitution area with a high wall to close of the neighbourhood. When the forces of Giuseppe Garibaldi advanced towards Naples in June 1860 in an effort to unify Italy, political unrest increased in the city. Cappuccio formed a demonstration with hundreds of prostitutes and camorristi in redshirts – the symbol of Garibaldi – and tore down the wall. The next day, authorities ordered the rebuilding of the wall. In the night of 27–28 August 1860, when Garibaldi was closing in on Naples, Cappuccio led another assault on the wall and destroyed it again.

Meanwhile, Garibaldi’s troops were preparing to enter the city, and a major battle seemed inevitable. Desperate to avoid large scale bloodshed, the police chief, Liborio Romano, turned to the head of the Camorra, Salvatore De Crescenzo, to maintain order and appointed him as head of the municipal guard. Cappuccio also entered the Camorra-dominated guard. As such, he understood the changing political climate and did not oppose the rebuilding of the wall, threatening anyone who dared to oppose his decision.

Head-in-chief of the Camorra
In 1869, he was elected as the capintesta (head-in-chief) of the Camorra by the twelve district heads (capintriti), succeeding Salvatore De Crescenzo after a short interregnum. Both Cappuccio and De Crescenzo were arrested on 6 October 1869, with some 80 other camorristi. He was released after a month, and rumour has it that the arrest was merely a plot so that Cappuccio could thank the Camorra inmates for his election and hear their demands.

After his release from prison, Cappuccio left the Imbrecciata and moved to the elegant Via Nardones. Close to his house he opened a vrennaiuolo shop selling bran and carob at the piazza San Ferdinando.  The sale of those commodities allowed him, like many other camorristi, to control the ranks of the crews of coachmen, on which he imposed the purchase of fodder for their horses. He also facilitated money lending at usury rates. The shop was also a way to get involved in the lucrative business of the sale of horses released by the military.

Reforming the Camorra
Cappuccio modernized the Bella Società Riformata (Beautiful Reformed Society) as the Camorra was known at the time. He established the rule that a Camorrista had to have a regular job as a cover. Much criticized at the time, given that members were almost all vagrants, this innovation later proved useful when special laws against the associations of criminals was issued and the criminals could prove to have honest and stable work. Together with his two lieutenants, Ettore Longo and Gaetano Buongiorno, the new capintesta also compiled a new code for the Beautiful Reformed Society. The most interesting article, the one that revolutionized the ancient customs of the association, was marked with the number 151, and aimed to reduce the number of dichiaramenti (duels) that continuously took place in the streets of Naples between Camoristi, killing each other and endangering the lives of passers-by.

All these innovations generated discontent on the board of the capintriti. In April 1874 he staged a kind of coup d’etat in the Beautiful Reformed Society, deposing many district bosses and replacing them with others he could trust. His adversaries tried to have him killed. On 23 April 1874 a masked hit-man entered Cappuccio’s shop on Piazza San Ferdinando and shot at him four times; one bullet grating his face. Rumour soon spread that the capintesta was dead. The news even reached the newspapers, causing uproar. The next day, his face bandaged, Cappuccio mounted a carriage and crossed half of Naples showing he was still alive. To celebrate the narrow escape, he went on a pilgrimage to Montevergine and reaffirmed his leadership.

The episode established his reputation of being invulnerable and to a certain extent this was true because since the failed assassination attempt he wore a special steel mesh manufactured specially for him by a gunsmith. From that moment he became a sort of absolute monarch of the Beautiful Reformed Society, abolishing the annual meetings of the district heads to elect the head-in-chief. His reputation was such that some camorristi preferred to commit suicide rather than be called before the Gran Mamma, the supreme tribunal of the Camorra.

Death, myth and legend
Just 50-years old, he died on 5 December 1892 from a heart attack while he was having dinner. The king of Naples ('‘o rre 'e Napole) was dead, according to an obituary in the Neapolitan daily newspaper Il Mattino. Three days after his death, Ferdinando Russo, a popular poet of the period, published  a poem "Canzone 'e Ciccio Cappuccio" in Il Mattino, immortalising the legendary Camorra chief. He was succeeded by Enrico Alfano. Other sources mention that after the death of Cappuccio, Giuseppe Chirico, 'o Granatiere (The Grenadier), from the Porta San Gennaro neighbourhood was elected. He was defeated in a zumpata – a kind of ritual initiation knife duel – by Totonno 'o pappagallo (The Parrot) – so-named for his beak parrot nose – who took over the reign before being defeated by Alfano.

Over the years more and more legends grew around his personality distorting the facts by fiction. Acts of other gangsters were attributed to him, including that of having quelled a revolt caused by a massacre of Italians at Aigues-Mortes, which, in fact, happened eight months after the death of Cappuccio.

The most retold legend is the one when he entered the prison of San Francisco for the first time. He had a stutter and he could not stand the orders of the master of the wool mill where he worked. One day, with unexpected violence, he took his knife and slashed across the face of his employer. Ciccio was arrested and sentenced to seven years in jail. When he entered the prison cell, he was approached with the usual request for lamp oil; the customary kickback new inmates had to pay. Cappuccio refused and was attacked by twenty inmates. Only one emerged unscathed from the battle: Ciccio Cappuccio. Twelve ended up with battered heads and seven with broken arms. The story was recounted in Russo's poem, but is largely a myth.

References
Notes

Sources
Behan, Tom (1996). The Camorra, London: Routledge, 
 Consiglio, Alberto (2005). La camorra a Napoli, Naples: Guida Editori, 
Dickie, John (2014). Blood Brotherhoods: Italy and the Rise of Three Mafias, New York: PublicAffairs, 
 Di Fiore, Gigi (1993). Potere camorrista: quattro secoli di malanapoli, Naples: Guida Editori, 
 Paliotti, Vittorio (2006). Storia della Camorra, Rome: Newton Compton editore, 

1840s births
1892 deaths
Criminals from Naples
Camorristi